Putahow Lake is a lake in north-west Manitoba near the provincial boundary with Nunavut, Canada. Putahow Lake is a lake with an average elevation of 321 meters above sea level.  Mean temperature range is from -30 deg C in January to +14 deg C in July.

References

Lakes of Manitoba